The Chief Minister of West Bengal is the representative of the Government of India in the state of West Bengal and the head of the executive branch of the Government of West Bengal. The chief minister is head of the Council of Ministers and appoints ministers. The chief minister, along with their cabinet, exercises executive authority in the state. The governor appoints the chief minister, whose council of ministers are collectively responsible to the assembly. 

On 17 August 1947, the British Indian province of Bengal was partitioned into the Pakistani province of East Bengal and the Indian state of West Bengal. Since then West Bengal has had eight chief ministers, starting with Prafulla Chandra Ghosh of the Indian National Congress (INC) party as the premier. A period of political instability followed—West Bengal witnessed three elections, four coalition governments and three stints of President's rule between 1967 and 1972—before Siddhartha Shankar Ray of the INC served a five-year term.

The landslide victory of the Communist Party of India (Marxist)-led Left Front in the 1977 election began Jyoti Basu's 23-year continuous reign as chief minister. The length of his tenure was an all-India record until 2018, when he was surpassed by Sikkim's Pawan Kumar Chamling. Basu's successor Buddhadeb Bhattacharya continued Communist rule in West Bengal for another decade, when the Left Front was defeated in the 2011 election by the All India Trinamool Congress. Sworn in on 20 May 2011, Trinamool leader Mamata Banerjee is West Bengal's incumbent chief minister, the first woman to hold the office. She was subsequently voted to power in 2016 and 2021 assembly elections. Mamata Banerjee's TMC got a landslide win in 2021 assembly elections, securing  215 assembly seats out of 292.

Key

Premiers of West Bengal (1947–50)

Chief Ministers of West Bengal (1950–present)

See also
 List of deputy chief ministers of West Bengal
 List of Governors of West Bengal
 List of rulers of Bengal
 Prime Minister of Bengal

Footnotes

References

Further reading

"Left Front Government of Bengal: A Saga of Struggle" – a political history of West Bengal from the CPI(M)'s point of view

 
West Bengal
Chief Ministers
West Bengal politics-related lists